Kostuchna is a district of Katowice. It has an area of 8.59 km2 and in 2007 had 8,233 inhabitants.

References

Districts of Katowice